KNDB may refer to:

Radio stations 

 KNDB, a television station licensed to Bismarck, North Dakota, United States

Other 

 , a draughts organization based in the Netherlands
 , a draughts rating by the Koninklijke Nederlandse Dambond